12 Cassiopeiae (12 Cas) is a white giant in the constellation Cassiopeia, about 860 light years away.  It has an apparent magnitude of 5.4, so it faintly visible to the naked eye.

The spectrum of 12 Cassiopeiae is classified as a B9-type giant. About three times as massive as the Sun and 386 times as luminous, it has expanded away from the main sequence after exhausting its core hydrogen.

References

Cassiopeia (constellation)
Cassiopeiae, 12
0093
002011
001960
BD+61 0069
B-type giants